The Javan mastiff bat (Otomops formosus) is a species of bat in the family Molossidae that is endemic to Indonesia.

References

Otomops
Bats of Indonesia
Endemic fauna of Indonesia
Fauna of Java
Taxonomy articles created by Polbot
Mammals described in 1939
Taxa named by Frederick Nutter Chasen